The  was a commuter electric multiple unit (EMU) train type operated by the private railway operator Hankyu Corporation on the Hankyu Kyoto Main Line from 1957 until 1987.

Build details

1st batch
Based on the Kobe Line 1000 series and Takarazuka Line 1100 series, one three-car set (1301+1351+1302) and one two-car set (1303+1353) were delivered in 1957. Set 1301 featured transverse seating arranged in fixed 4-seat bays for use on limited-stop "limited express" services. Set 1303 had the same longitudinal bench seating as the 1000 and 1100 series sets. The sets were able to run on both 600 V and 1,500 V DC overhead power supply, as some 600 V sections still existed on Hankyu at the time of their introduction.

2nd batch
The second batch appeared in 1959, consisting of two more three-car sets (1305+1353+1306 and 1307+1354+1308), and one intermediate trailer (T) car (1352) to lengthen the earlier two-car set 1303. Set 1307 was delivered with three doors per side instead of two per side on the earlier sets.

3rd batch
In 1960, three intermediate trailer (T) cars, numbered 1355 to 1357, were delivered to lengthen the existing three-car sets. These all had longitudinal seating, and car 1357 had three doors per side.

4th batch
In 1961, one more intermediate trailer (T) car, numbered 1358, was delivered. This had longitudinal seating and two doors per side.

Later developments
In 1966, set 1301 was modified with longitudinal seating replacing the original transverse seating, and was no longer used on limited express services.

Most of the 1300 series cars were retrofitted with roof-mounted air-conditioning between 1975 and 1976.

Withdrawal
The 1300 series were scrapped between 1984 and 1987, with no special final runs held to mark their withdrawal. None of them were preserved.

References

Electric multiple units of Japan
1300 series
Train-related introductions in 1957

ja:阪急1010系電車#1300系
600 V DC multiple units
1500 V DC multiple units of Japan